The Waiariki River is a river of the Northland Region of New Zealand's North Island. It is one of the upper tributaries of the Wairua River, which it reaches near the settlement of Waiotu, approximately halfway between Whangarei and Kawakawa.

See also
List of rivers of New Zealand

References

Rivers of the Northland Region
Rivers of New Zealand
Kaipara Harbour catchment